Liogma nodicornis is a species of cylindrotomid crane flies, insects in the family Cylindrotomidae.

References

Cylindrotomidae
Articles created by Qbugbot
Insects described in 1865
Taxa named by Carl Robert Osten-Sacken